Normandy is an unincorporated community and census-designated place (CDP) in Maverick County, Texas, United States. It was first listed as a CDP prior to the 2020 census.

It is in the northwest part of the county, along U.S. Route 277 in the Rio Grande valley.

References 

Populated places in Maverick County, Texas
Census-designated places in Maverick County, Texas
Census-designated places in Texas